Myśliborzyce may refer to the following places:
Myśliborzyce, Masovian Voivodeship (east-central Poland)
Myśliborzyce, Opole Voivodeship (south-west Poland)
Myśliborzyce, West Pomeranian Voivodeship (north-west Poland)